Trilobopsis is a genus of small, air-breathing land snails, terrestrial pulmonate gastropod mollusks in the family Polygyridae.

Distribution
The distribution of this species is restricted to Oregon and California, USA.

Description
The shells of species in this genus are somewhat globular and about 5 to 8 mm in diameter (1/4 to 3/16 inch).

Snails in this genus are distinguished from related snails on the basis of their reproductive anatomy.

Species 
Species in the genus Trilobopsis include:
Trilobopsis loricata (Gould, 1846)
Trilobopsis loricata lowei (Pilsbry, 1925)
Trilobopsis loricata mariposa Pilsbry, 1940
Trilobopsis loricata nortensis (Berry, 1933)
Trilobopsis loricata perforata Pilsbry, 1940
Trilobopsis loricata sonomaensis (Hemphill, 1911)
Trilobopsis penitens (Hanna & Rixford, 1923)
Trilobopsis roperi (Pilsbry, 1889)
Trilobopsis tehamana (Pilsbry, 1928)
Trilobopsis trachypepla (Berry, 1933)

References

Polygyridae